Uvalde County is a county located in the U.S. state of Texas. As of the 2020 census, its population was 24,564. Its county seat is Uvalde. The county was created in 1850 and organized in 1856. It is named for Juan de Ugalde, the Spanish governor of Coahuila. Uvalde County was founded by Reading Wood Black, who also founded the city of Uvalde, Texas. Uvalde County comprises the Uvalde, TX Micropolitan Statistical Area.

History

Native Americans
Artifacts establish human habitation dating back to 7000 B.C. Evidence of a permanent Indian village on the Leona River at a place south of the Fort Inge site is indicated in the written accounts of Fernando del Bosque's exploration in 1675. Comanche, Tonkawa, Seminole and Lipan Apache continued hunting and raiding settlers into the 19th century.

Early explorations
On January 9, 1790, Juan de Ugalde, governor of Coahuila and commandant of the Provincias Internas, led 600 men to a decisive victory over the Apaches near the site of modern Utopia at a place known then as Arroyo de la Soledad. In honor of his victory, the canyon area was thereafter called Cañon de Ugalde. French botanist Jean-Louis Berlandier visited the area in the late 1820s. James Bowie guided a group of silver prospectors into the area of north central Uvalde County in the 1830s. A trail used by General Adrián Woll's Mexican Army on its way to attack San Antonio in 1842 crossed the territory of Uvalde County and became the main highway to San Antonio.

Early settlements
Fort Inge was established in 1849 to repress Indian depredations on the international border with Mexico, and was served by the Overland Southern Mail.

One of the first settlers to the environs was William Washington Arnett, who arrived in the winter of 1852. The Canyon de Ugalde Land Company, formed by land speculators in San Antonio in 1837, began purchasing headright grants in Uvalde County in the late 1830s. Reading Wood Black, who with a partner, Nathan L. Stratton, purchased an undivided league and labor on the Leona River in 1853 at the future site of Uvalde. May 2, 1855,  Black hired San Antonio lithographer Wilhelm Carl August Thielepape, and laid out Encina, the town later known as Uvalde. Waresville settlement by Capt. William Ware in the upper Sabinal Canyon and Patterson Settlement by George W. Patterson, John Leakey, and A. B. Dillard on the Sabinal River coincided with Reading Black's development of the Leona River at Encina.

County established and growth

In November 1855, Reading Wood Black successfully lobbied the Texas Legislature to organize Uvalde County. On May 12, the county was formally organized. On June 14, Encina was named county seat. The second floor of the courthouse was made into a school, and six school districts were organized for the county in 1858. The San Antonio-El Paso Mail route was extended along the county's main road with a stop at Fort Inge in 1857.

Conflict between Mexicans and Anglos during and after the Mexican War continued in Uvalde County, with the reported lynching of eleven Mexicans near the Nueces River in 1855. Laws passed in 1857 prohibited Mexicans from traveling through the county.

Residents of Uvalde County voted 76–16 against secession from the Union. The abandonment of Fort Inge immediately after secession was followed by renewed Indian attacks. Many men in Uvalde County fought for the Confederacy, while some Unionists fled to Mexico to avoid persecution.

Uvalde County endured three decades of unrelenting lawlessness after the Civil War. Violence, lawlessness and Confederate-Union conflicts among citizens were so pervasive that armed guards were employed to assist the county tax assessor and collector, and the county had no sheriff for nearly two years. The years immediately following the Civil War were marked by conflicts between Confederates and Unionists returning to live in Uvalde County. Smugglers, cattle rustlers and horse rustlers, and numerous other desperadoes saturated the area, including notorious cattle rustler, J. King Fisher who was appointed Uvalde sheriff in 1881. Willis Newton of The Newton Gang robbed his first train near Uvalde. Jess and Joe Newton retired to Uvalde.

The Uvalde Umpire began publication in 1878 and the Hesparian in 1879.

The Galveston, Harrisburg, and San Antonio Railway was built through the county, passing through Sabinal and Uvalde City, in 1881.

William M. Landrum introduced Angora goats to the area in the 1880s. By the turn of the century, goats outnumbered cattle.

Old West lawman Pat Garrett lived in the county from 1891 to 1900.

By 1905 the Southern Pacific Railroad had established railheads in Uvalde, Knippa, and Sabinal.

The local bee industry developed a product that received first place in the 1900 Paris World's Fair.

Garner State Park built by the Civilian Conservation Corps and opened in 1941. Garner Army Air Field the same year.

The National Fish Hatchery, completed in 1937, produced a million catfish, largemouth bass and sunfish in the 1970s.

Approximately $45 million was generated by farming in Uvalde County in 1974.

In January 1989 Uvalde County withdrew from the Edwards Underground Water District.

In 1990 Uvalde County had a population of 23,340, with 60% identified as Hispanic.

Desegregation
From the Mexican Revolution in 1910, immigrant labor force cleared large tracts of land and dug ditches as irrigation spread throughout the county. The Uvalde and Northern Railway to Camp Wood, the Asphalt Beltway Railway in 1921, and the expansion of the asphalt mines in far southwestern Uvalde County at Blewett and Dabney were completed with the help of Mexican labor. By 1960 Mexican Americans made up one half of Uvalde County's 16,015 population. Seasonal migrant workers continued to move to Uvalde and Sabinal during the 1960s.

The Alien Land Laws of 1891, 1892 and 1921 prohibited ownership of Texas land by non-citizen residents. The laws were repealed in 1965 by the Fifty-ninth Texas Legislature. These and other discriminatory deed restrictions had limited Tejanos in the purchase of town lots in the county.

Efforts to gain civil rights for Hispanics in Uvalde County began with the establishment of the Tomas Valle Post of the American Legion. County churches maintained segregated places of worship until an integrated Catholic church emerged in Uvalde in 1965.

The Mexican American Youth Organization formed in Uvalde City in 1968 and eventually led to a 6-week walkout by more than 600 Mexican-American students an on April 14, 1970. The Texas Rangers and the Texas Department of Public Safety responded to requests by the school board to help control the volatile situation. Senator Walter F. Mondale, chairman of the United States Senate Committee on Equal Educational Opportunity, went to Uvalde on July 30, 1970, and criticized city officials in an interview published in the Uvalde Leader News.

A 1970 class action lawsuit was filed by Genoveva Morales on behalf of her children against the Uvalde Consolidated Independent School District.

In 1975, the United States Court of Appeals for the Fifth Circuit found that Uvalde C.I.S.D. in Texas had failed to desegregate its school system in violation of the Fourteenth Amendment to the United States Constitution and Title VI of the Civil Rights Act of 1964. In 1976, the Court ordered Uvalde C.I.S.D. to comply. In 2007, Uvalde C.I.S.D. sought to dismiss the desegregation order. The Mexican American Legal Defense and Education Fund (MALDEF) opposed. On September 15, 2008, a settlement was reached.

2017 church bus crash
On March 29, 2017, thirteen senior citizens from the First Baptist Church of New Braunfels in Comal County who had completed a retreat at Alto Frio Baptist Encampment near Leakey in Real County were killed when Jack D. Young, the 20-year-old driver of a pickup, crashed into the church minivan on U.S. Highway 83 inside Uvalde County near Garner State Park. One person survived the crash in critical condition. The collision was one of the deadliest in memory in Uvalde County.

Young, who worked on his father's ranch and at a golf course and had no criminal record, told a witness, "I'm sorry, I'm sorry," and said that he had been on his cell phone at the time of the crash. Jody Kuchler, a welder from Leakey who saw the accident, said that the driver of the church vehicle moved over to try to avoid Young's incoming pickup but was blocked by the presence of a guard rail.

2022 school shooting
 
On May 24, 2022, 19 children and two teachers were killed in a school shooting in Uvalde, Texas. The shooter, Salvador Rolando Ramos, had shot his grandmother before driving to Robb Elementary School, where he entered the building without opposition. Local officers, believing the shooter to be barricaded safely inside the school, stood outside waiting for further instruction. Video shows local officers forcing parents behind police tape, pinning them down and threatening to tase them, preventing them from trying to save their children's lives. After an hour, the killer was shot by BORTAC agents.

Geography

Major highways
  U.S. Highway 83
  U.S. Highway 90
  State Highway 55
  State Highway 127

Adjacent counties

 Real County (north)
 Bandera County (northeast)
 Medina County (east)
 Frio County (southeast)
 Zavala County (south)
 Maverick County (southwest)
 Kinney County (west)
 Edwards County (northwest)

Demographics

As of the 2020 United States census, there were 24,564 people, 8,921 households, and 6,206 families residing in the county.

As of the census of 2000, there were 25,926 people, 8,559 households, and 6,641 families residing in the county. The population density was 17 people per square mile (6/km2). There were 10,166 housing units at an average density of 6 per square mile (3/km2). The racial makeup of the county was 75.68% White, 0.36% Black or African American, 0.68% Native American, 0.39% Asian, 0.08% Pacific Islander, 19.65% from other races, and 3.16% from two or more races. 65.91% of the population were Hispanic or Latino of any race.

There were 8,559 households, out of which 40.2% had children under the age of 18 living with them, 59.4% were married couples living together, 13.7% had a female householder with no husband present, and 22.4% were non-families. 19.9% of all households were made up of individuals, and 9.8% had someone living alone who was 65 years of age or older. The average household size was 2.96 and the average family size was 3.42.

In the county, the population was spread out, with 31.4% under the age of 18, 9.80% from 18 to 24, 25.3% from 25 to 44, 20% from 45 to 64, and 13.6% who were 65 years of age or older. The median age was 32 years. For every 100 females there were 95.00 males. For every 100 females age 18 and over, there were 90.70 males.

The median income for a household in the county was $27,164, and the median income for a family was $30,671. Males had a median income of $25,135 versus $16,486 for females. The per capita income for the county was $12,557. About 19.90% of families and 24.3% of the population were below the poverty line, including 33.9% of those under age 18 and 18.6% of those age 65 or over.

Communities

Cities
 Sabinal
 Uvalde (county seat)

Census-designated places
 Knippa
 Utopia
 Uvalde Estates

Unincorporated community
 Concan

Politics

Education
School districts within the county include:
 Knippa Independent School District
 Leakey Independent School District
 Nueces Canyon Consolidated Independent School District
 Sabinal Independent School District
 Utopia Independent School District
 Uvalde Consolidated Independent School District

Southwest Texas Junior College, the designated community college for the whole county under the Texas Education Code, has a campus next to Uvalde on the site of Garner Field. The Garner Field facility also houses a campus of Sul Ross State University.

See also

 Reading Wood Black
 List of museums in South Texas
 National Register of Historic Places listings in Uvalde County, Texas
 Recorded Texas Historic Landmarks in Uvalde County
 Friedrich Armand Strubberg

Notes

References

Further reading
 Welder, F.A. and R.D. Reeves. (1964). Geology and ground-water resources of Uvalde County, Texas [U.S. Geological Survey Water-Supply Paper 1584]. Washington, D.C.: U.S. Government Printing Office.

External links
 Uvalde County government's website
 
 Inventory of the county archives of Texas : Uvalde County, no. 232, hosted by the Portal to Texas History
 Texas Beyond History, Kincaid Shelter
 ''Uvalde County Profile" from the Texas Association of Counties

 
1856 establishments in Texas
Populated places established in 1856